Christian Brothers' College, Boksburg is a Roman Catholic private school located in the town of Boksburg (Ekurhuleni) in Gauteng, South Africa. The school accommodates children from grade 000 to grade 12. The school is made up of the pre-grade, primary and high school.

History
The school was founded in 1935 on the same site as the school is located today. The original buildings from the foundation of the school remain today. The school was run by Christian Brothers who taught the pupils of the school but in recent years the brothers have been replaced by lay teachers, i.e. teachers who are not members of a religious order. The school is deeply influenced by the ideals of Edmund Ignatius Rice, the founder of the Christian Brothers.

College ethos

As a school which was started by the SA Christian Brothers almost 80 years ago in the spirit of Edmund Rice, founder of the Christian Brothers’ Schools (1803) the school holds to the tenets upon which the first Christian Brothers’ school was founded. This is celebrated each day in all aspects of college life, and also through regular liturgies, masses as well as outreach and advocacy experiences.

Outreach

With a large part of the ‘heart-beat’ of the college being focussed on service and community, the need to serve a cause and the importance of caring for others finds tangible expression within the Edmund Rice Society (ERS). The staff and boys are constantly involved in projects and initiatives within the community with an emphasis on impacting social injustices.

Sport
The college offers summer and winter sports, including cricket, hockey, rugby, swimming, athletics, tennis, squash, golf, soccer and basketball

References

External links
 

Private schools in Gauteng
Educational institutions established in 1935
1935 establishments in South Africa
Boarding schools in South Africa
Catholic boarding schools
Congregation of Christian Brothers secondary schools
Ekurhuleni